Abdullah Mohammad Saad is a Bangladeshi film director, screenwriter and producer. His debut film is Live from Dhaka (2016), which received Silver Screen Awards for Best Director and Best Performance at the 27th Singapore International Film Festival. His second film Rehana Maryam Noor was selected in the Un Certain Regard section at the 2021 Cannes Film Festival.Rehana Maryam Noor also earned him the Jury Grand Prize at the Asia Pacific Screen Awards.

Early life
Saad born in 1985 in Chittagong, Bangladesh. He studied education and research at University of Dhaka.

Career
Under his own production company he has produced short films and commercials. In 2016, his debut feature film Live from Dhaka premiered in Singapore International Film Festival on 2 December 2016. It was released to theaters on 29 March 2019. At the 27th Singapore International Film Festival, it received Silver Screen Awards for Best Director and Best Performance (Mostafa Monwar).

His second feature film Rehana Maryam Noor screened at the Cannes Film Festival on 7 July 2021. It was the first Bangladeshi film featured in the Un Certain Regard category of the festival.

Filmography

Awards and nominations

References

External links 
 

Bangladeshi film directors
University of Dhaka alumni
Living people
1985 births
Date of birth missing (living people)
People from Chittagong